People's National Party or Peoples National Party may refer to:

Current
People's National Party in Jamaica
People's National Party (Russia)
People's National Party (Tonga)
United Kashmir People's National Party
Awami National Party, in Pakistan, sometimes called the People's National Party
Kuomintang, Republic of China, is sometimes translated in English as the People's National Party
People's National Party (USA)

Historical
People's National Party (Belize)
People's National Party (Fiji)
People's National Party (Ghana)